Ya (hiragana: や, katakana: ヤ) is one of the Japanese kana, each of which represents one mora. The hiragana is written in three strokes, while the katakana is written in two. Both represent . Their shapes have origins in the character 也.

When small and preceded by an -i kana, this kana represents a palatalization of the preceding consonant sound with the  vowel (see yōon).

や can be used by itself as a grammatical particle to connect words in a nonexhaustive list (see Japanese particles#ya).

Stroke order

Other communicative representations

 Full Braille representation

 The yōon characters ゃ and ャ are encoded in Japanese Braille by prefixing "-a" kana (e.g. Ka, Sa) with a yōon braille indicator, which can be combined with the "Dakuten" or "Handakuten" braille indicators for the appropriate consonant sounds.

 Computer encodings

References 

Specific kana